McCully Workshop Inc. is the eponymous debut album of South African psychedelic rock band McCully Workshop. The album was produced by Billy Forrest on the Trutone Records label who had joined Trutone as record producer in 1968. Trutone had recently been acquired, in 1967, by Gallo (Africa) Limited. Gallo went on to become one of the internationally recognized giants in the music world. The album draws on a number of musical styles and is influenced by the likes of; The Beatles in particular 'Sgt Pepper', Frank Zappa, Pink Floyd, and the Moody Blues 'Threshold Of A Dream'.

Artwork 
The front cover photograph was taken by Sigurd Olivier and features a cat named 'Sirikit'. The graffiti on the wall was drawn by the McCullagh brothers father. The band photographs on the back cover were taken by Humphrey Clinker.

Track listing

Chart positions 

Singles

Personnel 

McCully Workshop
 Tully McCully (née McCullagh) – vocals, bass, guitar
 Mike McCully (née McCullagh) – vocals, drums
 Richard Hyam – rhythm and acoustic guitars, vocals
 Glenda Wassman - organ, vocals
 Ian Smith – trumpet, flute, flugelhorn

Additional personnel
 Allan Faull – lead guitar on 'Why Can't It Rain', 'The Circus', 'Hardcase Woman' and 'Stargazer'
 Alan van der Merwe – vocal harmony and organ on 'Why Can't It Rain' and 'Stargazer'
 Melanie Hyam – vocal harmonies on 'Why Can't It Rain' and 'Rush Hour At Midnight'

Production
 Billy Forrest

See also 
Music of South Africa

Footnotes

References 
Books
 

Articles
 
 

Web

External links 
 McCully Workshop Inc.
 McCully Workshop Family Tree
  McCully Workshop on Facebook
  McCully Workshop on Twitter

McCully Workshop albums
1970 debut albums